The montane foliage-gleaner (Anabacerthia striaticollis) is a species of bird in the family Furnariidae.
It is found in Bolivia, Colombia, Ecuador, Peru, and Venezuela.

Fairly common and generally widespread in canopy and borders of montane forest; the most frequently seen foliage-gleaner in many subtropical Andean forests. Relatively easy to watch, the Montane Foliage-gleaner forages actively, sometimes even acrobatically, at middle and upper tree levels, clambering along branches, often hanging upside down or moving out onto terminal twigs, pausing to inspect epiphytes and dead leaves. One or 2 regularly accompany many mixed flocks. Not very vocal, but foraging birds give an occasional sharp "peck" call; dawn song is a series of tyrannid-like, irregularly paced "pik" or "peck" notes.

"Above mostly olivaceous brown to slightly rufescent brown, crown grayer with prom. buffy white eyering and postocular streak; dusky cheeks faintly streaked buff, tail contrasting bright rufous, throat dull white faintly mottled dusky (looks essentially unmarked in field), rest of underparts pale olivaceous buff with a few vague dusky streaks on chest."

It sings "an accelerating-decelerating series of thin, metallic notes; sometimes on an even pitch, but often it falls before rising: chip chip chip-chip-chip'tip'tip'tiptiptipt'tip'tip'chip-chip chip."

Its natural habitat is subtropical or tropical moist montane forest, along east slope of Andes, .

References

montane foliage-gleaner
Birds of the Northern Andes
montane foliage-gleaner
Taxonomy articles created by Polbot
Taxa named by Frédéric de Lafresnaye